Fairy Tail is a Japanese manga series written and illustrated by Hiro Mashima. It was serialized in Kodansha's Weekly Shōnen Magazine from August 2006 to July 2017, with the individual chapters collected and published into 63 tankōbon volumes. The story follows the adventures of Natsu Dragneel, a member of the popular wizard guild Fairy Tail, as he searches the fictional world of Earth-land for the dragon Igneel.

The manga has been adapted into an anime series produced by A-1 Pictures, Dentsu Inc., Satelight, Bridge, and CloverWorks which was broadcast in Japan on TV Tokyo from October 2009 to March 2013. A second series was broadcast from April 2014 to March 2016. A third and final series was aired from October 2018 to September 2019. The series has also inspired numerous spin-off manga, including a prequel by Mashima, Fairy Tail Zero, and a sequel storyboarded by him, titled Fairy Tail: 100 Years Quest. Additionally, A-1 Pictures has developed nine original video animations and two animated feature films.

The manga series was originally licensed for an English release in North America by Del Rey Manga, which began releasing the individual volumes in March 2008 and ended its licensing with the 12th volume release in September 2010. In December 2010, Kodansha USA took over the North American release of the series. The Southeast Asian network Animax Asia aired an English-language version of the anime for seven seasons from 2010 to 2015. The manga was also licensed in the United Kingdom by Turnaround Publisher Services, in Australia by Penguin Books Australia, and in Argentina by Editorial Ivrea. The anime has been licensed by Crunchyroll for an English release in North America. As of February 2020, the Fairy Tail manga had over 72 million copies in print, making it one of the best-selling manga series of all time.

Plot

The world of Earth-land is home to numerous guilds where wizards apply their magic for paid job requests. Natsu Dragneel, a Dragon Slayer wizard from the Fairy Tail guild, explores the Kingdom of Fiore in search of his missing adoptive father, the dragon Igneel. During his journey, he befriends a young celestial wizard named Lucy Heartfilia and invites her to join Fairy Tail. Natsu, Lucy, and the cat-like Exceed Happy form a team, which is joined by other guild members: Gray Fullbuster, an ice wizard; Erza Scarlet, a magical knight; and Wendy Marvell and Carla, another Dragon Slayer and Exceed duo. The team embark on numerous missions together, which include subduing criminals, illegal dark guilds, and ancient Etherious demons created by Zeref, a wizard cursed with immortality and deadly power.

After several adventures, Natsu and his companions find Zeref living in isolation on Fairy Tail's sacred ground of Sirius Island, where he expresses a desire to die for the atrocities he has committed. A battle over Zeref ensues between Fairy Tail and the dark guild Grimoire Heart, which attracts the attention of the evil black dragon Acnologia. The Fairy Tail wizards survive Acnologia's assault when the spirit of their guild's founder and Zeref's estranged lover, Mavis Vermillion, casts the defensive Fairy Sphere spell that places them into seven years of suspended animation. Later, Fairy Tail wages war against Tartaros, a dark guild of Etherious who aim to unseal a book believed to contain Zeref's ultimate demon, E.N.D. When Acnologia returns to annihilate both guilds, Igneel – revealed to have sealed himself within Natsu – emerges to battle Acnologia, only to be killed in front of a helpless Natsu, who departs on a training journey to avenge Igneel.

After Natsu returns one year later, Fiore is invaded by the Alvarez Empire, a military nation ruled by Zeref, who intends to acquire Fairy Heart, a wellspring of infinite magic power housed within Mavis's equally cursed body preserved beneath Fairy Tail's guild hall. While battling Zeref, Natsu is informed of his own identity as both Zeref's younger brother and the true incarnation of E.N.D. (Etherious Natsu Dragneel), whom Zeref resurrected as a demon with the intention of being killed by him. When Natsu fails to do so, Zeref absorbs Fairy Heart from Mavis in a bid to rewrite the present timeline with one where he might prevent his own curse and Acnologia's rise to power. After Natsu defeats Zeref to stop the drastic changes to history his actions would create, Mavis lifts her and Zeref's curse by reciprocating his love, which kills them both.

Meanwhile, Fairy Tail and their allies detain Acnologia within a space-time rift created by the use of Eclipse, Zeref's time travel gate. However, Acnologia escapes while his disembodied spirit traps all of the present Dragon Slayers within the rift to maintain his godlike power. Lucy and many other wizards across the continent immobilize Acnologia's body within Fairy Sphere, while Natsu accumulates the other Dragon Slayers' magic and destroys Acnologia's spirit, killing him and freeing the Dragon Slayers from captivity. The following year, Natsu and his team depart on a century-old guild mission, continuing their adventures together.

Production
After finishing his previous work, Rave Master, Hiro Mashima found the story sentimental and sad at the same time, so he wanted the storyline of his next manga to have a "lot of fun." His inspiration for the series was sitting in bars and partying with his friends. He also described the series as being about young people finding their calling, such as a job. Mashima drew a one-shot titled Fairy Tale that was published in Magazine Fresh on September 3, 2002, which served as a pilot. Mashima's later concept for the serialized version involved Natsu as a fire-using member of a courier guild who carries various things on assignments. Mashima then came up with the idea to have different types of wizards hanging out in one place, and eventually coerced his editor into allowing him to change the concept to a wizard guild. The title was changed from "Tale" to "Tail" in reference to the tail of a fairy, which the author said may or may not prove to be a "pivotal point." Mashima stated that while he tried to consider both his own interests and the fans' on what would happen next in Fairy Tail, the fans' took precedence.

In the period between Rave Master and Fairy Tail, all but one of Mashima's assistants left, and the artist said making sure that the three new ones knew what to do was the hardest thing throughout the first year of serialization. Mashima described his weekly schedule for creating individual chapters of Fairy Tail in 2008: script and storyboards were written on Monday, rough sketches the following day, and drawing and inking were done Wednesday through Friday; time in the weekends was for Monster Hunter Orage, a monthly series Mashima was writing at the same time. He usually thought up new chapters while working on the current ones. Mashima had six assistants in 2008 that worked in an  area with seven desks, as well as a sofa and TV for video games. In 2011, he stated that he worked six days a week, for 17 hours a day.

For the characters of the series, Mashima drew people he had known in his life. In establishing the father-son relationship between Natsu and Igneel, Mashima cited his father's death when he was a child as an influence. He took Natsu's motion sickness from one of his friends, who gets sick when they take taxis together. When naming the character, the author thought western fantasy names would be unfamiliar to Japanese audiences, so he went with the Japanese name for summer; Natsu. Mashima based the reporter character Jason on American manga critic Jason Thompson, who interviewed him at 2008's San Diego Comic-Con, and another on an employee from Del Rey Manga, the original North American publisher of Fairy Tail. He based the humorous aspects of the series on his daily life and jokes his assistants would make.

Publication

Main series

Written and illustrated by Hiro Mashima, Fairy Tail was serialized in the manga anthology Weekly Shōnen Magazine from August 2, 2006, to July 26, 2017. The 545 individual chapters were collected and published into 63 tankōbon volumes by Kodansha between December 15, 2006, and November 17, 2017. In 2008, a special crossover one-shot between Fairy Tail and Miki Yoshikawa's Flunk Punk Rumble, titled , was published in Weekly Shōnen Magazine. It was later included in Fairy Tail+, an official fanbook released on May 17, 2010. Another crossover with Mashima's first series Rave was published in 2011. A special issue of Weekly Shōnen Magazine, published on October 19, 2013, featured a small crossover between Fairy Tail and Nakaba Suzuki's The Seven Deadly Sins, where each artist drew a yonkoma (four-panel comic) of the other's series. An actual crossover chapter between these two ran in the magazines' combined 4/5 issue of 2014, which was released on December 25, 2013. A two-volume series called Fairy Tail S, which collects short stories by Mashima that were originally published in various Japanese magazines through the years, was released on September 16, 2016.

The series was licensed for an English-language release in North America by Del Rey Manga. The company released the first volume of the series on March 25, 2008, and continued until the release of the 12th volume in September 2010. After Del Rey Manga shut down, Kodansha USA acquired the license and began publishing Fairy Tail volumes in May 2011. They published the 63rd and final volume on January 23, 2018. Kodansha USA began publishing a larger omnibus version of the series in November 2015. Called Fairy Tail: Master's Edition, each installment corresponds to five regular-sized volumes. They published the first volume of Fairy Tail S: Tales from Fairy Tail on October 24, 2017.

The manga has also been licensed in other English-speaking countries. In the United Kingdom, the volumes are distributed by Turnaround Publisher Services. In Australia and New Zealand, the manga is distributed by Penguin Books Australia.

Spin-offs
Eight spin-off manga series based on Fairy Tail have been released. The first two series—Fairy Tail Zero by Mashima and Fairy Tail: Ice Trail by Yūsuke Shirato—began with the launch of a monthly magazine titled Monthly Fairy Tail Magazine on July 17, 2014, and ended in the magazine's thirteenth and final issue published on July 17, 2015. A third series, Fairy Tail Blue Mistral by Rui Watanabe, ran in Kodansha's shōjo manga magazine Nakayoshi from August 2, 2014, to December 1, 2015, while another, Fairy Girls by Boku, was released in Kodansha's Magazine Special from November 20, 2014, to August 20, 2015. Kyōta Shibano created a three-part meta-series titled Fairy Tail Gaiden, which was launched in Kodansha's free weekly Magazine Pocket mobile app. The series began in 2015 with Twin Dragons of Saber Tooth from July 30 to November 4, continued with Rhodonite from November 18, 2015, to March 30, 2016, and concluded with Lightning Gods in 2016 from May 4 to September 14. Fairy Tail: 100 Years Quest, a sequel to the original manga, began serialization on Magazine Pocket on July 25, 2018. It is storyboarded by Mashima and illustrated by Atsuo Ueda. Another spin-off, Fairy Tail: Happy's Heroic Adventure by Kenshirō Sakamoto, began on July 26 on the same app. On June 27, 2018, Mashima announced another spin-off manga for the app, Fairy Tail City Hero, written and illustrated by Ushio Andō.

All eight Fairy Tail spin-off manga, including all three installments of Gaiden, are licensed for English release by Kodansha USA.

Media

Anime

A-1 Pictures, Dentsu Entertainment, and Satelight produced an anime adaptation of the manga. The anime, also titled Fairy Tail and directed by Shinji Ishihira, premiered on TV Tokyo on October 12, 2009. The series ended its run on March 30, 2013, with reruns beginning to air on April 4, 2013, under the title Fairy Tail Best!. Forty-one DVD volumes containing four episodes each have been released. The Southeast Asian network Animax Asia aired the series locally in English. On January 18, 2011, British anime distributor Manga Entertainment announced on Twitter that the company would release the anime series in bilingual format at the end of the year. On April 21, 2011, they had confirmed that the first volume with 12 episodes would be released in February 2012; however, they later announced that the first volume would be released on March 5, 2012. In 2011, North American anime distributor Funimation Entertainment announced that they had acquired the first season of the ongoing series. The series made its North American television debut on November 22, 2011, on the Funimation Channel. The anime is also licensed by Madman Entertainment, who streamed and simulcasted the series on AnimeLab in Australia and New Zealand Melanesian Region (Fiji, Papua New Guinea, Solomon Islands and Vanuatu), Polynesian Region (Cook Islands, Niue, Samoa, Tonga, and Tuvalu). Funimation announced that the ninth installment would get the DVD/Blu-ray release on March 25, 2014.

On March 4, 2013, Mashima announced on his Twitter account that the anime would not end yet, and confirmed on July 11 that a sequel series was greenlit. The sequel series was officially confirmed in Weekly Shonen Magazine on December 28, 2013, with a special edition chapter. The sequel is produced by A-1 Pictures and Bridge, featuring character designs by Shinji Takeuchi; the original series' voice actors also returned to the project along with director Shinji Ishihira and writer . The official website for the sequel was launched on January 7, 2014. The series premiered on TV Tokyo on April 5, 2014, and was being simulcast by Funimation Entertainment. The second series concluded its run on March 26, 2016. On March 22, 2016, Mashima announced via Twitter that another Fairy Tail series was being developed. On July 20, 2017, Mashima confirmed on Twitter that the final season of Fairy Tail would air in 2018. The final season of Fairy Tail aired from October 7, 2018, to September 29, 2019. A-1 Pictures, CloverWorks, and Bridge produced and animated the final season, which ran from October 7, 2018, to September 29, 2019. for 51 episodes.

Following Sony's acquisition of Crunchyroll, the dub was moved to Crunchyroll.

Original video animation
Nine original video animations (OVAs) of Fairy Tail have been produced and released on DVD by A-1 Pictures and Satelight, each bundled with a limited edition tankōbon volume of the manga. The first OVA,  is an adaptation of the manga omake of the same name, and was released with Volume 26 on April 15, 2011. The second,  is also an adaptation of the omake of the same name, and was released together with Volume 27 on June 17, 2011. The third,  was released together with Volume 31 on February 17, 2012, and features an original story written by series creator Hiro Mashima. The fourth, "Fairies' Training Camp", is based on chapter 261 of the manga, and was released with Volume 35 on November 16, 2012. The fifth,  is based on chapter 298 of the manga and was released with Volume 38 of the manga on June 17, 2013. A sixth OVA, titled  is an adaptation of the omake of the same name and was released on August 16, 2013, with Volume 39 of the manga.

Theatrical films
An anime film adaptation of Fairy Tail, titled Fairy Tail the Movie: Phoenix Priestess, was released on August 18, 2012. It was directed by Masaya Fujimori, and its screenplay was written by anime staff writer . Series creator Hiro Mashima was involved as the film's story planner and designer for guest characters appearing in the film. To promote the film, Mashima drew a 30-page prologue manga , which was bundled with advance tickets for the film. The DVD was bundled with a special edition release of Volume 36 of the manga on February 13, 2013, and included an animated adaptation of "Hajimari no Asa" as a bonus extra. The film was aired on Animax Asia on March 23, 2013. Funimation has licensed North American distribution rights to the film. The English dub premiered at Nan Desu Kan on September 13, 2013, and was released on Blu-ray/DVD on December 10, 2013.

A second anime film was announced on May 15, 2015. On December 31, 2016, the official title of film was revealed as Fairy Tail: Dragon Cry, which was released on May 6, 2017, in Japan.

Video games
An action video game for the PlayStation Portable, titled  was unveiled at the 2009 Tokyo Game Show. The game was developed by Konami Examu Games inc. and was released on June 3, 2010. Two sequels to Portable Guild have also been released for the PlayStation Portable—the first, subtitled Portable Guild 2, was released on March 10, 2011; the second,  was released on March 22, 2012. The characters Natsu and Lucy also appeared as playable characters in the crossover video game Sunday VS Magazine: Shūketsu! Chōjō Daikessen for the PSP in 2009.

In 2016, a browser game developed by GameSamba titled Fairy Tail: Hero's Journey was announced to be open for closed beta testing.

On September 5, 2019, it was announced that a role-playing video game titled Fairy Tail, developed by Gust Co. Ltd. and published by Koei Tecmo would be released for PlayStation 4, Nintendo Switch, and Steam on March 19, 2020, worldwide; the game was later delayed to June 25. The game was then delayed to July 30, 2020, in Japan and Europe, and in North America on July 31, 2020, due to the COVID-19 pandemic.

Audio
The music for the anime was composed and arranged by Yasuharu Takanashi. Four original soundtrack CDs have been released, containing music from the anime: the first soundtrack volume was released on January 6, 2010, the second volume on July 7, 2010, the third soundtrack volume on July 6, 2011, and the fourth soundtrack volume on March 20, 2013. Character song singles were also produced; the first single, featuring Tetsuya Kakihara (Natsu) and Yuichi Nakamura (Gray) was released on February 17, while the second single, featuring Aya Hirano (Lucy) and Rie Kugimiya (Happy), was released on March 3, 2010. Another character song album, entitled "Eternal Fellows," was released on April 27, 2011. Two of the songs from the album, performed by anime cast members Tetsuya Kakihara (Natsu) and Aya Hirano (Lucy), were used for both OVAs as the opening and ending themes, respectively. Other songs on the volume are performed by Yuichi Nakamura (Gray), Sayaka Ohara (Erza), Satomi Satō (Wendy), Wataru Hatano (Gajeel), and a duet by Rie Kugimiya (Happy) and Yui Horie (Carla).

An internet radio program began airing on HiBiKi Radio Station on February 11, 2012, featuring anime voice actors Tetsuya Kakihara (Natsu) and Mai Nakahara (Juvia) as announcers.

Reception

Manga
As of February 2020, the Fairy Tail manga had 72 million collected volumes in circulation. In France, the series had sold over 7.7 million copies by 2018. According to Oricon, Fairy Tail was the eighth best-selling manga series in Japan for 2009, fourth best in 2010 and 2011, fifth best of 2012, dropped to ninth in 2013, to 17th in 2014, and was 15th in 2015. The fifth volume of Fairy Tail was ranked seventh in a list of the top ten manga, and the series once again placed seventh after the release of the sixth volume. About.com's Deb Aoki listed Fairy Tail as the Best New Shōnen Manga of 2008. Fairy Tail won Best Manga Series of 2008 at the 2009 Anime & Manga Grand Prix held by French magazine AnimeLand. It also won the 2009 Kodansha Manga Award for shōnen manga. At the 2009 Industry Awards for the Society for the Promotion of Japanese Animation, the organizers of Anime Expo, Fairy Tail was named Best Comedy Manga. It also won Best Shōnen Manga at the 2009 Japan Expo Awards. Volume 9 of the manga was nominated in the Youth Selection category at the 2010 Angoulême International Comics Festival. On TV Asahi's Manga Sōsenkyo 2021 poll, in which 150.000 people voted for their top 100 manga series, Fairy Tail ranked 65th.

Reviewing the first volume, Carl Kimlinger of Anime News Network (ANN) felt Fairy Tail followed standard shōnen action manga tropes, writing "the mix of goofy humor, face-crushing action, and teary-eyed sap is so calculated as to be mechanical." Carlo Santos, also of Anime News Network, agreed in his review of volume three; having positive views towards the art, particularly the action scenes, but citing a lack of story and character development. By volume 12 Santos suggested that Mashima's true talent lies in "taking the most standard, predictable aspects of the genre and somehow still weaving it into a fun, fist-pumping adventure." Reviewing the first 11 volumes, ANN's Rebecca Silverman wrote that while the art in the early arcs of Fairy Tail may not be its best, the stories arguably are. She also praised Lucy and Erza as strong female characters. Her colleague Faye Hopper was more critical, calling the manga a "somewhat mediocre shounen series [that] pushes enough buttons" so as to make her want to read more.

Kimlinger, Silverman, and A.E. Sparrow of IGN all felt Mashima's artwork had strong similarities to Eiichiro Oda's in One Piece. While Sparrow used the comparison as a compliment and said it had enough unique qualities of its own, Kimlinger went so far as to say it makes it difficult to appreciate Mashima's "undeniable technical skill."

Anime
The anime has also received a positive response from critics and viewers alike. In Southeast Asia, Fairy Tail won Animax Asia's "Anime of the Year" award in 2010. In 2012, the anime series won the "Meilleur Anime Japonais" (best Japanese anime) award and the best French dubbing award at the 19th Anime & Manga Grand Prix in Paris.

In reviewing the first Funimation Entertainment DVD volumes, Carlo Santos of Anime News Network praised the visuals, characters, and English voice acting, as well as the supporting characters for its comedic approach. However, Santos criticized both the anime's background music and CGI animation. In his review of the second volume, Santos also praised the development of "a more substantial storyline," but also criticized the inconsistent animation and original material not present in the manga. In his review of the third volume, Santos praised the improvements of the story and animation, and said that the volume "finally shows the [anime] series living up to its potential." In his reviews of the fourth and sixth volumes, however, Santos praised the storyline's formulaic pattern, though saying that "unexpected wrinkles in the story [...] keep the action from getting too stale," but calling the outcomes "unpredictable".

Notes
General

Translations

References

External links
 
 Official manga website of Kodansha 
 Official anime website of TV Tokyo 
 Official anime sequel website 
 

 
2009 anime television series debuts
2011 anime OVAs
2012 anime films
2012 anime OVAs
A-1 Pictures
Adventure anime and manga
Anime series based on manga
Avex Group
Bridge (studio)
CloverWorks
Comics about magic
Crunchyroll anime
Del Rey Manga
Fantasy anime and manga
Fictional guilds
Kodansha manga
Manga adapted into films
Muse Communication
Satelight
Shōnen manga
TV Tokyo original programming
Video games postponed due to the COVID-19 pandemic
Winner of Kodansha Manga Award (Shōnen)